Stone Station is an unincorporated community in Spartanburg County, in the U.S. state of South Carolina.

History
The community was named for J. M. Stone, who kept a local store. An old variant name of the community was Bishop. A post office called Bishop was established in 1895, and remained in operation until 1907.

References

Unincorporated communities in Spartanburg County, South Carolina
Unincorporated communities in South Carolina